Acacia asperulacea is a shrub belonging to the genus Acacia and the subgenus Lycopodiifoliae.

Description
It blooms in May and produces yellow flowers. The phyllodes are arranged in whorls each with 10 to 14 phyllodes. Each flower head contains 15 to 30 flowers. The seed pods that form later are linear and glabrose  with thickened margins.

A. asperulacea typically lives to an age of 11 to 20 years and is able to produce seeds after three years.

Taxonomy
The species was first formally described by the botanist Ferdinand von Mueller in 1859 as part of the work Contributiones ad Acaciarum Australiae Cognitionem as published in the Journal of the Proceedings of the Linnean Society, Botany. Several synonyms for the plant are known including Acacia lycopodiifolia var. glabrescens by George Bentham, Acacia galioides var. asperulacea by Karel Domin and Racosperma asperulaceum by Leslie Pedley.

Distribution
It is native to an area in the eastern Kimberley region of Western Australia where it grows in skeletal soils. Its range extends to the east into the Northern Territory and to far north west Queensland.

See also
List of Acacia species

References

asperulacea
Acacias of Western Australia
Plants described in 1859
Taxa named by Ferdinand von Mueller